Dusted may refer to:
Dusted (Gin Blossoms album), 1989
Dusted (Live Skull album), 1987
Dusted (Skrew album), 1994
Dusted (British band), the joint venture of Rollo & Mark Bates
Dusted (Canadian band), a Canadian indie rock band
"Dusted" (song), a 1999 song by Leftfield from their album Rhythm and Stealth

See also
Dust (disambiguation)
Dusting (disambiguation)